Aderaldo Ferreira André  (born 14 June 1977), known as just Aderaldo, is a Brazilian football defender.

Career
Aderaldo played for EC Vitória in the 2003 Campeonato Brasileiro Série A. He also played for Paraná Clube in Série B.

References

External links
 

1977 births
Brazilian footballers
Brazilian expatriate footballers
Living people
Brazilian expatriate sportspeople in China
Clube de Regatas Brasil players
Ituano FC players
Comercial Futebol Clube (Ribeirão Preto) players
Esporte Clube Juventude players
Esporte Clube Vitória players
Joinville Esporte Clube players
Botafogo Futebol Clube (SP) players
Paraná Clube players
Associação Portuguesa de Desportos players
Associação Desportiva São Caetano players
Centro Sportivo Alagoano players
MŠK Žilina players
Slovak Super Liga players
AC Bellinzona players
Beijing Guoan F.C. players
Shanghai Shenhua F.C. players
Chinese Super League players
Expatriate footballers in China
Expatriate footballers in Switzerland
Expatriate footballers in Slovakia
Brazilian expatriate sportspeople in Slovakia
Brazilian expatriate sportspeople in Switzerland
Association football defenders
Sportspeople from Alagoas